Walking Tree Publishers was founded in 1996 by members of the (now defunct) Swiss Tolkien Society with the aim of publishing the proceedings of the Cormarë conference held that year to mark the 10th anniversary of the Swiss Tolkien Society. The company is run by volunteers and on a no-profit basis, with surplus money being reinvested into new products. It is dedicated exclusively to the publication of English-language works concerned with J. R. R. Tolkien and Tolkien studies.

Publications

Monographs
Richard Sturch, Four Christian Fantasists: A Study of the Fantastic Writings of George MacDonald, Charles Williams, C.S. Lewis and J.R.R. Tolkien (2001), . 
Mark T. Hooker, Tolkien Through Russian Eyes (2003), . 
Christopher Garbowski, Recovery and Transcendence for the Contemporary Mythmaker: The Spiritual Dimension in the Works of J.R.R. Tolkien (2004), .
Ross Smith, Inside Language (2007), .
Martin Simonson, The Lord of the Rings and the Western Narrative Tradition (2009), 
John S. Ryan, Tolkien's View: Windows into his world (2009),

Collections
News from the Shire and Beyond - Studies on Tolkien (1997), .
Tolkien in Translation (2003),  .
Translating Tolkien: Text and Film (2004), . 
Thomas Honegger (ed.), Reconsidering Tolkien (2005), 
Thomas Honegger and Frank Weinreich (eds.), Tolkien and Modernity, 2 vols. (2006), 
Tom Shippey, Roots and Branches (2007),  (collected essays).
Eduardo Segura and Thomas Honegger (eds.), Myth and Magic: Art according to the Inklings (2007), .
Adam Lam and Nataliya Oryshchuk (eds.), How We Became Middle-earth (2007), .
Allan Turner (ed.), The Silmarillion: 30 years on (2007), .
Heidi Steimel and Friedhelm Schneidewind (eds.), Music in Middle-Earth (2009), .
Monika Kirner-Ludwig, Stephan Köser and Sebastian Streitberger (eds.), Binding them all - Interdisciplinary Perspectives on JRR Tolkien and His Works (2017), .

Art
Beowulf and the Dragon (2009) : the dragon episode of Beowulf, illustrated by Anke Eißmann.

Fanfiction
Kay Woollard, The Terror of Tatty Walk, Tales of Yore Series No. 1 (2000), 
Kay Woollard, Wilmot's Very Strange Stone, Tales of Yore Series No. 2 (2002) .

External links
Company website

Publishing companies of Switzerland
Tolkien studies
Non-profit organisations based in Switzerland
Science fiction studies organizations
Organizations established in 1996
Publishing companies established in 1996
Canton of Bern
Swiss companies established in 1996